The Music of Nashville: Season 1 Volume 2 is the second soundtrack album for the American musical drama television series Nashville, created by Academy Award winner Callie Khouri and starring Connie Britton as Rayna Jaymes, a legendary country music superstar, whose stardom begins fading, and Hayden Panettiere as rising teen star Juliette Barnes. The album was released on May 7, 2013 through Big Machine Records, with tracks 12-16 available on the Target deluxe edition.

The album became the tenth best-selling soundtrack album of 2013 with 120,000 sold for the year.

Track listing

Deluxe edition

Charts

Weekly charts

Year-end charts

References

Television soundtracks
Music of Nashville: Season 1, Volume 2
Country music soundtracks
Big Machine Records soundtracks
2013 soundtrack albums